Naticarius canrena is a species of predatory sea snail, a marine gastropod mollusk in the family Naticidae, the moon snails.

Distribution

Description 
The maximum recorded shell length is 65 mm.

Habitat 
Minimum recorded depth is 0 m. Maximum recorded depth is 101 m.  A living adult specimen was trapped off West coast BARBADOS at around 400 ft. depth.

References

External links
 
 

Naticidae
Gastropods described in 1758
Taxa named by Carl Linnaeus